The cantera (quarry) of Spanish professional football club Real Sociedad is the organisation's youth academy, developing players from childhood through to the integration of the best prospects into the adult teams.

The final category within the youth structure is the Juvenil A under-18/19 team which represents the club in national competition. The successful graduates then usually move to the club's reserve teams, Real Sociedad C or Real Sociedad B, which are also considered part of the cantera due to being a stage in progression towards the senior team, albeit competing in the adult league system.

The academy is based at the club training complex, Zubieta, which is often the name used informally to refer to the system itself.

Background and structure

The top football clubs in the Spanish leagues generally place great importance in developing their cantera to promote the players from within or sell to other clubs as a source of revenue, and Real Sociedad is no exception. Until the late 1980s, the club operated a Basque-only player recruitment policy but abandoned this in order to remain competitive; however their youth recruitment network is still focused around their home region of Gipuzkoa and there are collaboration agreements in place with the small clubs in the region, assisted financially by the regional government. In 2013, it was noted that 22 of the 23 members of the Juvenil A squad that season were from Gipuzkoa.

Most of the senior team players in recent seasons are youth academy graduates: 15 of the squad in 2014 (as per analysis from the CIES Football Observatory). In 2016, Real Sociedad's total of 16 'homegrown players' (as per UEFA guidelines: three years of training between 15 and 21 years old) still at their formative club was the second-highest across Europe's 'big five' leagues, significantly more than all other elite clubs apart from neighbours Athletic Bilbao. Moreover, further end-of-year analysis demonstrated that these graduates were not merely backup squad members but integral elements of the team, involved  in 50% of the minutes in the 2016–17 La Liga, where they finished 6th. With the inclusion of nine former trainees at other eligible clubs, Real's total of 25 homegrown players ranked as the fifth-highest across the continent, although only third in Spain behind Real Madrid and FC Barcelona who retained just a few of the many high-level professionals they produced.

Real Sociedad's good standing in La Liga since being promoted back in 2010 – including qualifying for the 2013–14 UEFA Champions League – was achieved using a large proportion of homegrown players, with the vast majority of those hailing from the local region (which has a population of just 715,000, a small catchment area for an elite football club, and with that potential pool of talent drained further by frequent swoops for the best youngsters by Athletic Bilbao), indicating a high standard of coaching and development of the young players at their disposal. A notable exception to this local focus was Antoine Griezmann from France who was integrated into the setup at a young age after his potential was identified by Real staff at an event; in 2014 he left the club for a transfer fee of €30 million.

The core of boys from the Gipuzkoa region are first introduced into the Zubieta Alevín teams at around 10 years of age and advance by an age group every season through Infantil, Cadete and Juvenil levels. The players who are retained by Real after their Juvenil A spell (aged about 17) would typically join Real Sociedad C – a 2016 addition to the club structure – with that squad normally expanded further with some signings from the regions's youth clubs such as Antiguoko, a small San Sebastián team who regularly challenge the professional youth teams for the title in their División de Honor group. The players usually spend one or two seasons at Real C before the best are promoted to the reserve team Sanse and then on to the senior team when considered ready to do so.

In addition to Griezmann, the Real Sociedad youth system produced three other players during the 2010s who commanded large transfer windfalls when they departed: Asier Illarramendi moved to Real Madrid in July 2013 for €32.2 million only to return two years later for around half that amount; in January 2018, Iñigo Martínez signed for rivals Athletic Bilbao after they paid his €32 million release clause fee; in July of that year, Álvaro Odriozola also moved to Real Madrid for a fee reported to be €30 million plus €5 million of conditional add-ons.

National competitions
The Juvenil A team play in Group II of the División de Honor Juvenil de Fútbol as their regular annual competition. Their main rivals in the league group are Athletic Bilbao and Osasuna. The under-17 team, Juvenil B or Easo (named after a nickname for San Sebastián which itself derives from the nearby Roman town of Oiasso), plays in the Liga Nacional Juvenil de Fútbol which is the lower division of the same structure.

The team also regularly participates in the Copa de Campeones and the Copa del Rey Juvenil, qualification for which is dependent on final league group position.  In these nationwide competitions the opposition includes the academy teams of Barcelona, Atlético Madrid, Sevilla and Real Madrid.

International tournaments

In 2012–13 Real Sociedad's senior team qualified for the UEFA Champions League group stages, meaning that the Juvenil squad could play in the  2013–14 version of the UEFA Youth League. They finished top of their group in the competition but were eliminated from the knockout stage by Schalke 04.

In the subsequent years there has been no further chance to participate due to the senior team failing to qualify. The alternative route into the Youth League would be to win the previous season's Copa de Campeones but Real Juvenil have so far been unable to achieve this.

Head coaches
The coaches are often former Real players who themselves graduated from Zubieta, which is also true of Loren Juarros, the club's former director of football who held the post from 2009 until 2018.

Current squad (Juvenil A

Season to season (Juvenil A)

Superliga / Liga de Honor sub-19
Seasons with two or more trophies shown in bold

División de Honor Juvenil
Seasons with two or more trophies shown in bold

Honours

 División de Honor (Group II): (regional league)
 2 1982 (Liga Nacional Juvenil 1975 to 1986)
 7 1997, 1998, 1999, 2008, 2012, 2014, 2015 (current format since 1995)
 Copa de Campeones Juvenil:
Winners: 2 1998, 1999
Runners-up: 2014
 Copa del Rey Juvenil:
Winners: 1 1955
Runners-up: 1952, 1968

Famous players
The club's purpose-built training centre and academy at Zubieta dates from 1982, but special mention should be given to the generation of players who emerged just prior to its opening: Real Sociedad were La Liga winners in 1981 and 1982 with a playing squad filled with homegrown talent (not all players were developed from childhood, but those who did arrive later were acquired from the region's local clubs in their teens or early 20s and improved further). A group comprising Luis Arconada, Genaro Zelaieta, Inaxio Kortabarria, Juan Antonio Larrañaga, Alberto Górriz, Gaztelu, Periko Alonso, José Diego, Roberto López Ufarte, Peio Uralde, José Mari Bakero, Jesús María Zamora and Jesús María Satrústegui all became Spanish internationals.

Since that successful era, many more players have emerged from the youth system to star for the Real Sociedad first team or play elsewhere at a high level, including:

  – players currently at Real Sociedad in bold, 'graduation' year in parentheses

 

Alberto Albstegui (1982)
Txiki Begiristain (1982)
Miguel Fuentes (1983)
Luciano Iturrino (1983)
Loren (1984)
Javier Bengoetxea (1985)
David Villabona (1986)
Alberto (1987)
José Antonio Pikabea (1988)
Mikel Lasa (1988)
Mikel Roteta (1988)
Imanol Alguacil (1989) 
Bittor Alkiza (1990)
Andoni Imaz (1990)
Agustín Aranzábal (1992)
Javier de Pedro (1992)
Iñigo Idiakez (1992)
Aitor López Rekarte (1994)
Joseba Etxeberria (1994)
Mikel Aranburu (1996)
José Javier Barkero (1996)
Igor Gabilondo (1997)
Joseba Llorente (1998)
Mikel Labaka (1999)
Mikel Alonso (1999)
Gari Uranga (2000)
Xabi Alonso (2000)
Asier Riesgo (2001)
Javier Garrido (2001)
Gorka Larrea (2002)
Xabi Prieto (2002)
 
Iñigo Díaz de Cerio (2003)
Markel Bergara (2003)
Xabier Castillo (2004)
Imanol Agirretxe (2004)
Mikel González (2004)
Carlos Martínez (2004)
Gorka Elustondo (2005)
Dani Estrada (2005)
Manu García (2005)
David Zurutuza (2005)
Mikel Balenziaga (2006)
Borja Viguera (2006)
Asier Illarramendi (2008)
Iñigo Martínez (2009)
Dani García (2009)
Antoine Griezmann (2009)
Rúben Pardo (2010)
Joseba Zaldúa (2010)
Kenan Kodro (2011)
Aritz Elustondo (2012)
Jon Bautista (2013)
Mikel Oyarzabal (2014)
Álvaro Odriozola (2014)
Andoni Gorosabel (2014)
Igor Zubeldia (2015)
Aihen Muñoz (2015)
Ander Guevara (2015)
Martín Zubimendi (2016)
Ander Barrenetxea (2018)

See also
 Real Sociedad senior team 
  Real Sociedad B, ‘Sanse’ 1st reserve team 
 Real Sociedad C 2nd reserve team

References

External links
Official website 

Real Sociedad
Football academies in Spain
División de Honor Juvenil de Fútbol
UEFA Youth League teams